Zakaria Kiani is a Moroccan professional footballer who plays as a right-back for Ittihad Tanger.

References

Moroccan footballers
Wydad AC players
Association football fullbacks
1987 births
Living people
Renaissance Club Athletic Zemamra players